Lesia Thetsane (born 24 May 1997) is a Mosotho footballer who plays as a defender or midfielder for Ballard FC of USL League Two and for the Kansas City Comets in the Major Arena Soccer League.

Career

Before the 2018 season, Thetsane joined Columbia College Cougars in the United States. Thetsane signed a professional contract with the Major Arena Soccer League's Kansas City Comets on August 31, 2021. Before the 2022 season, he signed for American side Ballard FC.

References

External links
  

1997 births
Living people
Association football defenders
Association football midfielders
Expatriate soccer players in the United States
Lesotho expatriate footballers
Lesotho expatriates in the United States
Lesotho footballers
Lesotho international footballers
USL League Two players
Major Arena Soccer League players
Missouri Comets players
Ballard FC players